Viktor Troicki was the defending champion, but his compatriot Janko Tipsarević defeated him in the first all-Serbian final in tennis history 6–4, 6–2.

Seeds
The top four seeds receive a bye into the second round.

Qualifying

Main draw

Finals

Top half

Bottom half

References
 Main Draw

2011 Men's Singles
Kremlin Cup - Men's Singles